Catostylidae is a family of jellyfish. Members of this family are characterized by their thick, sausage-like oral arms.

Description
Members of the family Catostylidae are small marine jellyfish with domed bells. The eight short oral arms are broad and three-sided. There is a network of branching canals linked with the primary ring canal, but these are not joined to the gastrovascular cavity except through the sixteen or thirty two radial canals. Some of these radial canals do not extend to the edge of the bell. There are eight sense organs, known as rhopalia, which have canals extending to the margin of the bell.

These jellyfish swim in jerks by contracting their circular and radial muscles, which decreases the volume of water enclosed under the bell, before relaxing them again and repeating the sequence. They have no control over the direction of locomotion and drift with the currents and tides.

Genera
 Acromitoides
 Acromitoides purpurus (Mayer, 1910)
 Acromitoides stiphropterus (Schultze, 1897)
 Acromitus
 Acromitus flagellatus (Haeckel)
 Acromitus maculosus Light, 1914
 Catostylus
 Catostylus cruciatus (Lesson, 1830)
 Catostylus mosaicus (Quoy & Gaimard, 1824)
 Catostylus ornatellus (Vanhöffen, 1888)
 Catostylus ouwensi Moestafa & McConnaughey, 1966
 Catostylus perezi Ranson, 1945
 Catostylus tagi (Haeckel, 1869)
 Catostylus townsendi Mayer, 1915
 Catostylus tripterus (Haeckel, 1880)
 Catostylus turgescens (Schulze, 1911)
 Catostylus viridescens (Chun, 1896)
 Crambione
 Crambione bartschi (Mayer, 1910)
 Crambione mastigophora Maas, 1903
 Crambionella
 Crambionella helmbiru Nishikawa, Mulyadi & Ohtsuka, 2014
 Crambionella orsini (Vanhöffen)
 Crambionella stuhlmanni (Chun, 1896)
 Leptobrachia
 Leptobrachia leptopus (Chamisso & Eysenhardt, 1821)

See also
Catostylus mosaicus, jelly blubber

References

 
Daktyliophorae